Belushi's is a British bar chain.

In 1993, the first Belushi's bar was opened in London's Covent Garden. In 1995, the first St Christopher's Inn backpacker hostel opened in Southwark. By 1999, the parent company Beds and Bars had six backpacker bars and 350 beds in London.

As of 2014, Beds and Bars has bars and/or hostels in London, Newquay, Bath and Edinburgh in the UK; and Amsterdam, Bruges, Berlin and Paris elsewhere in Europe.

References

Pub chains
Restaurants established in 1993
1993 establishments in England
Restaurant groups in the United Kingdom